Javier López Abadias (born 18 December 1998), commonly known as Javito, is a Spanish footballer who plays for CP Cacereño. Mainly a centre back, he can play in all positions across the back four and as a defensive midfielder.

Club career
Born in Huesca, Aragon, Javito finished his formation with SD Huesca. He made his senior debut with the farm team in 2016, in the Tercera División.

Javito made his professional debut on 26 March 2017, coming on as a late substitute for Samu Sáiz in a 3–1 away win against CD Mirandés in the Segunda División. On 25 July 2019, he moved to fourth-tier side CP Cacereño.

References

External links

1998 births
Living people
People from Huesca
Sportspeople from the Province of Huesca
Spanish footballers
Footballers from Aragon
Association football defenders
Association football midfielders
Association football utility players
Segunda División players
Tercera División players
AD Almudévar players
SD Huesca footballers
CP Cacereño players